Anchatgeri is a village in Dharwad district of Karnataka, India.

Demographics
As of the 2011 Census of India there were 878 households in Anchatgeri and a total population of 4,401 consisting of 2,228 males and 2,173 females. There were 593 children ages 0-6.

References

Villages in Dharwad district